Paul Kennedy is a former member of  the New Mexico Supreme Court, appointed by Governor Susana Martinez. Kennedy had previously served on the court under appointment from Governor Gary E. Johnson.

After serving as a United States Marine during the Vietnam War, Kennedy used a Fulbright Scholarship to earn a Juris Doctor from Georgetown University.

He practiced law at his own firm in New Mexico for thirty-six years. His practice focused on the civil rights including the right to free speech. He is fluent in both English and Spanish.

Judicial career

Kennedy first served as a judge when he was temporarily appointed by Governor Gary E. Johnson in 2002. After serving out his term, he returned to private practice. In 2012, Governor Martinez nominated Kennedy to the court again after he was unanimously selected by a non-partisan committee.

References

Justices of the New Mexico Supreme Court
Georgetown University Law Center alumni
Living people
Year of birth missing (living people)